Pierre II Mignard (20 February 1640 – 10 April 1725) was a French architect and painter. He was the son of painter Nicolas Mignard and the younger brother of Paul Mignard, a portrait painter.

Biography
Pierre II Mignard was born and died in Avignon.

In 1671, he became one of the first eight members of the Académie royale d'architecture created by Louis XIV.

Gallery 

17th-century French architects
18th-century French architects
17th-century French painters
18th-century French painters
Members of the Académie royale d'architecture
1640 births
1725 deaths
Artists from Avignon